Bezbożnik wojujący (translation of the name: "Militant Godless") was an anti-religious magazine in the Polish language. It was the publication of the Anti-Catholic Section at the Central Soviet of the League of Militant Atheists. 1929 No. 1 (December): 1930 − 3 No. No. (October - November, 1 unnumbered issue (April);
1931–1932 at 12 No.No. per year; 1933–1934 at 6 No.No. per year; 1935 — No. 1-3 (Jan. / Feb. - May / June).

The magazine was published in Moscow. The editor-in-chief of the magazine was Bolesław Przybyszewski.

References

Notes

 Российская национальная библиотека. Bezbożnik Wojujący
 Biblioteka Narodowa. Bezboznik wojujący

1935 disestablishments in the Soviet Union
1929 establishments in the Soviet Union
Anti-religious campaign in the Soviet Union
Anti-Christian sentiment in Europe
Anti-Christian sentiment in Asia
Atheism publications
Communist magazines
Magazines published in the Soviet Union
Defunct political magazines
Magazines established in 1929
Magazines disestablished in 1935
Magazines published in Moscow
Persecution of Muslims
Polish-language magazines
Propaganda in the Soviet Union
Propaganda newspapers and magazines
Religious persecution by communists
Anti-Islam sentiment in the Soviet Union